Ahmed Keshkesh (born 15 September 1984 in Gaza) is a Palestinian professional footballer currently playing for Markaz Shabab Al-Am'ari  of the West Bank Premier League.

Club career
His performance against Jordan, earned him a loan moved to Shabab Al-Ordon of the Jordanian Premier League but a permanent move failed to materialize due to Keshkesh being absent on national team duty for most of the loan period. The following season saw him unexpectedly sign for Jordanian giants Al-Wahdat his first season was a success despite being used mostly as a substitute and being played in a variety of unfamiliar positions. He only managed five league goals in his first season but was an important facto in  Al-Wahdat's 2–1 victory over Al-Jazeera in the 2009 Jordanian Super Cup, in which he scored the first goal. He also scored 7 goals in the Jordan FA Cup including the winning goal in the final against Al-Arabi.

In the 2010–11 season Keskesh saw less playing time due to acquisitions of Malik Barghouthi and Fahed Attal he still managed two league goals and scored in the Jordan FA Cup Final against Manshia Bani Hassan to help Al-Wahdat secure a historical domestic quadruple under manager Dragan Talajic. His two-year career with Al-Wahdat saw him score in every competition Al-Wahdat took part in scoring one goal in the 2009 Jordanian Super Cup, one goal in the 2010 AFC Cup, 7 goals in the league over two seasons, 9 goals in the Jordan FA Cup over two seasons, and 4 goals in the Jordanian Shield for a total of 21. On 4 June 2011, he signed a lucrative contract with his former West Bank Premier League club Markaz Shabab Al-Am'ari .

International career
He is perhaps best known for scoring the first goal in a historic encounter between Palestine and Jordan that marked the first time Palestine hosted an international match on home soil. He also captained the side on that historic occasion due to the absences of teammates Saeb Jendeya and Ramzi Saleh.

International goals
Scores and results list the Palestine' goal tally first.

References

External links

1984 births
Living people
Palestinian footballers
People from Gaza City
Expatriate footballers in Jordan
Palestine international footballers
Palestinian expatriate footballers
Al-Wehdat SC players
Palestinian expatriate sportspeople in Jordan
Footballers at the 2006 Asian Games
Association football midfielders
Asian Games competitors for Palestine
Association football forwards